The Geely PU is a subcompact vehicle from Chinese manufacturer, Geely Automobile.  It was introduced in 2001, available as a two-door coupe utility called the JL1010N sold from 2001 to 2005 then as the JL1010E1 from 2005 to 2007 as well as the two-door van known as the JL5010X from 2001 to 2004.

The PU is based on the Daihatsu Charade platform, which Geely licensed from Xiali.  Its basic underpinnings are shared with the HQ/Haoqing and Merrie/Uliou.

Production was finished in 2007. 

PU
Pickup trucks